Cody T. McMahan (born December 7, 1991) is an American professional stock car racing driver. He last competed part-time in the NASCAR Gander Outdoors Truck Series, driving the No. 1 Chevrolet Silverado for Beaver Motorsports and the No. 0 Silverado for JJC Racing.

Racing career
McMahan's interest in racing began when he attended his first race at the age of 4; as a 12-year-old, he began dirt track racing at Wythe Raceway. In 2011, he competed in the Charger division at Lonesome Pine Raceway with NASCAR veteran Eric McClure as his manager. That year, he won four races and Rookie of the Year honors. He eventually moved to the X-1R Pro Cup Series before making his ARCA Racing Series debut at Talladega Superspeedway in 2013, where he finished 12th.

In 2016, he joined JJC Racing for the NASCAR Camping World Truck Series race at Bristol Motor Speedway, but failed to qualify. Three years later, he successfully made the CarShield 200 at World Wide Technology Raceway at Gateway with Beaver Motorsports. After starting 31st, he finished 29th after retiring from the race on lap 32 with damage. A start in the NASCAR Hall of Fame 200 at Martinsville Speedway with JJC ended with his truck's engine failing before he could complete a lap.

Personal life
He attended Chilhowie High School, where he played quarterback for the high school football team. His grandfather Ken McMahan raced at Wythe Raceway from 1972 to 2004, where he won multiple track championships.

Motorsports career results

NASCAR
(key) (Bold – Pole position awarded by qualifying time. Italics – Pole position earned by points standings or practice time. * – Most laps led.)

Gander Outdoors Truck Series

ARCA Racing Series
(key) (Bold – Pole position awarded by qualifying time. Italics – Pole position earned by points standings or practice time. * – Most laps led.)

 Season still in progress
 Ineligible for series points

References

External links
 
 

NASCAR drivers
1991 births
Living people
People from Chilhowie, Virginia
Racing drivers from Virginia
ARCA Menards Series drivers
CARS Tour drivers